Neige is a 1981 French drama film directed by Juliet Berto and Jean-Henri Roger. It was entered into the 1981 Cannes Film Festival, where it won the Young Cinema Award.

Cast
 Juliet Berto - Anita
 Jean-François Stévenin - Willy
  - Jocko
 Paul Le Person - Bruno Vallès
 Jean-Marie Aubry
 Patrick Chesnais - The first Inspector
 Jean-François Balmer - The second Inspector
 Raymond Bussières - Menendez
 Eddie Constantine - Pierrot
 Nini Crépon - Betty
 Michel Berto - The blind
 Roger Delaporte - The blind
 Frédérique Jamet - Annie Vallès
 Bernard Lavilliers - Eddie
 Michel Lechat - Leclat
  - The blond

References

External links

1981 films
1980s French-language films
1981 drama films
Films directed by Juliet Berto
Films directed by Jean-Henri Roger
French neo-noir films
1980s French films